Aurora was formed in 2016 as a consortium of research-intensive universities deeply committed to the social impact of their activities, and with a history of engagement with their communities. As 9 universities working together, we want our academic excellence to influence societal change through research and educational activities – and ultimately to contribute to the achievement of the sustainable development goals.

Members

References

External links 
Official website

College and university associations and consortia in Europe